Holger Lindberg (20 August 1894 – 2 July 1966) was a Swedish wrestler. He competed in the Greco-Roman lightweight event at the 1920 Summer Olympics.

References

External links
 

1894 births
1966 deaths
Olympic wrestlers of Sweden
Wrestlers at the 1920 Summer Olympics
Swedish male sport wrestlers
People from Götaland